Ron Roy is an American actor, producer, director, writer, composer, singer-songwriter and cinematographer. He is best known as the creator of the Moodtapes DVD / CD Nature/Relaxation Series  and the producer/director of the annual two-hour television comedy special Stand Up Comics Take A Stand , which aired for four years nationally on The Family Channel.

He has produced, directed and/or starred in films, television, theater, documentaries, radio, commercials music videos, podcasts and iPhone apps.

Early life
Ron Roy was born in Shreveport, Louisiana. He graduated from Spring Branch High School in Houston, Texas in 1969. He attended the University of Texas, Sam Houston State University, and the University of Houston as a theater arts major. In 1973 he moved to Los Angeles to pursue his career in the entertainment industry.

Career
Ron Roy began his acting career in high school appearing in commercials for Joske's of Houston and then in college at the University of Texas in Arthur Millers After the Fall.

His first Hollywood role was playing a Texas State Trooper in Steven Spielberg's feature film Sugarland Express (Universal Pictures). In 1976 he played & narrated the leading role of Blair for the film Off the Edge  which was nominated for an Academy Award for best documentary feature. In 1977 he played the recurring role of Billy White Cloud in ABC TV’s The Feather and Father Gang  crime drama with series stars Stefanie Powers, Harold Gould, and The Man from U.N.C.L.E. – Robert Vaughn.

He also appeared on numerous network television series, TV movies and films such as Dallas, Police Story  Love Is Stronger, Baa Baa Black Sheep, Capitol, Divorce Court, A New Day in Eden, The CBS Special – One Last Ride, Institute for Revenge, Hard Times, The Private Life, the cult horror film 'Til Death, and many more. Roy also appeared in numerous national and regional commercials including Chevrolet Vega, Triumph Spitfire, Gillette, Johnson & Johnson, Zenith and numerous others.

Ron Roy was one of the principal creators of Fashion Rock Videos which were designed to promote Designer clothing combined with Rock Music in the 1980's and 90's. Roy's was chosen by DuPont to create a series of videos for Boy George's avant-garde Lycra fashion line BodyMap for which he won first place in the NY/INTL Fashion Video Awards  in 1985.

In 1988 Ron Roy became the producer and director of the two-hour comedy television special Stand Up Comics Take a Stand which aired on the CBN Family Channel for four seasons. This annual national comedy competition was created to discover "Hollywood's Hottest New Comic" and featured Kelsey Grammer, Steve Allen, Mickey Rooney, John Ritter, Morgan Fairchild, Dawn Wells, Tim Matheson, Catherine Bach, Carroll O'Connor, Phil Hartman and many others as celebrity hosts each season. It was also the national fundraiser for United Cerebral Palsy with Roy also performing as the Celebrity Guest Host for the premiere presentation in 1988.

Theatrically, Roy is best known for originating the stage role of Lieutenant Young in the world premiere of Ray Bradbury's The Martian Chronicles at the Colony Theater in Los Angeles. The presentation won five Los Angeles Drama Critics Circle Awards including Best Ensemble Performance.

Ron Roy is credited with writing numerous documentaries such as The Hollywood Cross, which won a Hollywood Angel Award, TV scripts for Stand Up Comics Take A Stand (1991), and the majority of his Moodtapes and Ron Roy Productions projects. His short story We All Need A Friend was also published in the Spirituality issue of The Journal (1997).

His dedicated Moodtapes YouTube Channel has a large variety of music videos and documentaries he's produced, directed and filmed and has garnered views in the millions. His spiritual documentary Jesus Face in the Clouds Praying by a Cross alone has over one point one million views and rising with viewers commenting: "Amazing and beautiful", "You gave me something to live for!" and "I loved this video!".

Roy has also been featured as a celebrity guest on network television talk shows such as Entertainment Tonight, The 700 Club, and The Oprah Winfrey Show and on numerous regional TV & Radio shows as well.

Personal projects

Ron Roy produced and marketed the top selling nature/relaxation audio and video collectible series Moodtapes, which included his own instrumental music edited to his original soothing footage of nature. He released nine videos and eight audio CDs: Tranquility, Autumn Whispers...Winter Dreams, Energy, Ocean Reflections, Contemporary Christmas, Whispering Waters, etc. He was the producer, director and cinematographer on all nine videos and his footage has been included in other films such as Nicole Conn's Cynara: Poetry in Motion and Michael Bay's Bad Boys II.

While filming one production Ocean Reflections, Roy joined the San Diego State University Marine Mammal Research and Conservation team capturing bottlenose dolphin images with R. H. Defran, the director of the Cetacean Behavior Laboratory.

Roy also created the meditation/relaxation podcast Relax With Moodtapes  which he wrote, produced and narrated. It attained Top Ten status in iTunes Fitness & Nutrition category and has remained popular since its inception. His two iPhone mobile apps Pacific Surf and Christmas Magic – featuring his soothing Moodtapes music and visuals – garnered Five Star ratings on iTunes. One reviewer called them "The most beautiful and relaxing apps ever!".

Most recently, Ron Roy has become involved in Americana Music as a composer, producer and singer-songwriter. His latest releases have received worldwide airplay on numerous terrestrial and streaming stations including Renegade Radio Nashville, Nashville's Trucker Radio Network, the Bandwagon Radio Network, Jango Radio and more.

Roy's Yuletide song "You’ll Never Ever Be Alone At Christmas" charted as a Number 1 Record on RadioAirplay's music charts and was named one of the Best Original Holiday Songs in their International Independent Songwriters Holiday Contest. It was also featured as the Premiere Christmas Song on Nashville's International Trucker Radio Network whose country music icon DJ Stan Campbell proclaimed: “The song is so relatable... I recommend it for every radio station for Christmas!” It continues to receive international airplay annually during the Christmas season.

Roy's Americana & Gospel songs also landed him at Number One in his hometown on Reverbnation's Americana Charts  and are also featured continuously on Jango Radio and numerous other internet radio stations worldwide.

His lifelong dedication to promoting a clean safe environment also lead him to become involved with Altergy Systems, a cutting edge zero emissions hydrogen fuel cell developer/manufacturer in Folsom, CA. They are dedicated to "Leading the Fuel Cell Revolution & Changing the Way the World Gets Its Power." Roy produces Altergy's documentary videos and serves as Media/PR Director and YouTube Channel creator. He has won numerous video awards for these clean and sustainable energy documentaries.

Diversely, Ron Roy is also an inventor who has received numerous US Patents for his various inventions primarily for industrial/consumer packaging.

Roy has been a lifelong supporter of respect and kindness towards animals and for animal rights. He has donated video documentary and public relations services to numerous organizations such as Actors And Others For Animals and similar animal protection groups to assist in their fundraising and publicity. He also works directly to assist American Veterans groups such as the Wounded Warrior Project and Horses and Heroes which utilize equestrian therapy to help injured veterans and their families "reclaim their lives".

Although Roy is currently semi-retired from a life in the entertainment industry, he is still very active in professional photography and cinematography where his award-winning images are utilized on television, social media and documentaries.and can be viewed on Instagram and Facebook. Roy's current hobbies include fly-fishing, skiing and collecting & personally restoring classic convertible automobiles. He has restored over thirty American and European Classics with his current collection including a 1965 Corvette Sting Ray, 1965 Ford Thunderbird, a 1966 Plymouth Fury III, a 40th Anniversary Chevrolet Corvette (C4) and a Jaguar XK8.

Filmography

Actor

Producer/Director/Cinematographer
 1984 – Thrill Of The Kill (Music Video) 
1985 – The Hollywood Cross (documentary)
1986 – Tranquility (video documentary) 
1985 – Body Map (Fashion Rock Video)
1987 – Fleece Chemise (Fashion Rock Video) 
 1987 – Moodtape's Energy (video) (producer/director)
 1987 – Floral Fantasy (video documentary) 
 1988 – Autumn Whispers… Winter Dreams 
 1988 – 1991 Stand-up Comics Take a Stand (TV Movie) 
 1991 – Contemporary Christmas (video documentary)
 1991 – Moodtapes: Ocean Reflections (video documentary short) 
 1992 – Moodtapes: Natural Environments – Whispering Waters (video documentary)
 1993 – Romantic Classics by Firelight (video documentary)
 1993 – Pacific Surf (video documentary) 
1995 – L'Image Fashion Party Video 
 1996 – Cynara: Poetry in Motion (cinematography)
 1997 – Moodtapes: Moments – Serenity (video documentary)
 1998 – Nature's Bouquet (video documentary)
 2003 – The Yule Log HD (TV Movie)
2006 – The Future Is Now (documentary)    
2006 – Relax with Moodtapes (iTunes Podcast)
2009 – Pacific Surf (iPhone App)
2010 – Christmas Magic (iPhone App)
2011 – Jingle Bells Chicken (Christmas Music Video)
2011 – Clair de Lune (Relaxation Music Video)
2011 – Danny Boy (Relaxation Video)
2011 – Sizzlin' Christmas (Christmas Rock Video)
2012 – Pacific Blue (Music Video)
2012 – Serenity Prayer (Motivational Video)
2012 – Jesus Face In The Clouds (Documentary)
 2013 – Viewzzz relaxation music videos (producer/director)
2013 – Tribute To America (Patriotic Rock Video)
2013 – Snowy White Christmas (Music Video)
2014 – Oregon Waters (Nature Relaxation Video)
2014 – Impressions of Winter (Music Video)
2014 – Angel of the Mountain Stream (Motivational Video)
2018 – Horses and Heroes (documentary)
2018 – Drift Away (Nature/Relaxation Video)
2019 – Amazing Grace Medley (Religious Music Video)   
2019 – Horses & Heroes II (documentary)

Television
Ron Roy and his video productions have been featured on national television programs: Entertainment Tonight, The Oprah Winfrey Show, Fox TV, MTV, VH-1, The Family Channel, The 700 Club, The Business Channel, CBS Morning Show, CNN, The Today Show etc.

Awards and nominations

 Hollywood Angel Award (1985)
 Seven International Telly Awards (1992 -1995)
 New York International Fashion Video Award 
 International Aegis Award (2006) 
 Davey Award (2006, silver winner)
 International Accolade Award (2009)
 American Film Institute / Billboard Magazine Award (1988)

References

External links
 
 Personal website
 

1951 births
Living people
20th-century American male actors
Male actors from Houston
American male film actors
American male television actors
American male voice actors
American cinematographers
Television producers from Texas